James Vincent Stanton (February 27, 1932 – May 2, 2022) was an American lawyer and politician who served three terms as a U.S. Representative from Ohio from 1971 to 1977.

Early life and career 
Born in Cleveland, Ohio, Stanton graduated from Holy Name High School in 1949 and then served in the United States Air Force from 1950 to 1954, during the Korean War. He earned an A.B. from the University of Dayton in 1958, and a J.D. from the Cleveland-Marshall College of Law in 1961. He became a member of the Ohio bar association that year, and went into private practice.

Political career 
Stanton served as a member of the Cleveland city council from 1959 to 1970, serving as president from 1964 to 1970. He was then elected as a Democrat to the 92nd and to the two succeeding Congresses (January 3, 1971 – January 3, 1977). In his last Congress, he was instrumental in getting House Doorkeeper William "Fishbait" Miller defeated by the House Caucus and installed his friend and protégé James Molloy in Miller's place.  Molloy kept the office until it was abolished in 1995.

Stanton was not a candidate for reelection to the House of Representatives in 1976, but was an unsuccessful candidate for nomination to the United States Senate.  He supported the man who bested him in the primary, Howard Metzenbaum.  Though he had been instrumental in that body in a few years, he tired of the slow progress a member encountered in gaining stature in such a body.

Later career 
After his political career, Stanton resumed the practice of law in Washington, D.C. from 1977 to 1981. He served as executive vice president of Delaware North Companies in Buffalo, New York, from 1981 to 1988. He went on to earn an A.M.P. from Harvard University Business School in 1984. He was a resident of Potomac, Maryland, and died on May 2, 2022.

References

External links
 Retrieved on 2010-01-02

1932 births
2022 deaths
Cleveland City Council members
Military personnel from Cleveland
Lawyers from Cleveland
Lawyers from Washington, D.C.
University of Dayton alumni
Cleveland–Marshall College of Law alumni
United States Air Force airmen
United States Air Force personnel of the Korean War
20th-century American politicians
Democratic Party members of the United States House of Representatives from Ohio
Members of Congress who became lobbyists